Adam Michael Rex (born May 16, 1973) is an American illustrator and author of children's books from Tucson, Arizona.

Career 
Adam Rex received a Bachelor of Fine Arts from the University of Arizona. He has contributed illustrations to Magic: The Gathering and other fantasy art and has illustrated several children's books. Adam has noted that his history with fantasy drawings initially hurt his entry into children's books. His first books, Tree-Ring Circus and Frankenstein Makes a Sandwich, were published in 2006. Frankenstein Makes a Sandwich went on to become a New York Times best seller.

Adam received the Jack Gaughan Award for Best Emerging Artist in 2005.

His first foray into illustration of children's books, 2003's The Dirty Cowboy, written by Amy Timberlake, received positive reviews, including from The Capital Times, which described Rex's work as "gorgeous... This is his first book, but you wouldn't know it from looking. His artwork has real resonance". The Santa Fe New Mexican wrote, "The consummate skill of Rex's illustrations combines with wit and knowledge of the physical and emotional terrain". The book, which is about a cowboy taking a bath, was banned at W.C. Andrews Elementary School in Texas in 2006, and by the Annville-Cleona School District in Pennsylvania in 2012. The ACLU report on the Texas incident noted that the "Principal did not want this book in the library."

His illustrations of the book The Case of the Case of Mistaken Identity, written by Mac Barnett, were reviewed favorably by The Gazette'''s critic, noting "a lively set of endpapers."

DreamWorks Animation adapted The True Meaning of Smekday into the animated feature film Home (2015), starring Rihanna and Jim Parsons.

Adam Rex cites Douglas Adams (author of The Hitchhiker's Guide to the Galaxy) as his biggest influence as a writer.

 Bibliography 

 Novels 
  The True Meaning of Smekday (Hyperion Books, Oct 2, 2007), illustrated
  Fat Vampire: A Never Coming of Age Story (Balzer + Bray/HarperCollins, Jul 27, 2010) – "secondary (senior high) school" material 
 Cold Cereal Saga (published by Balzer + Bray)
  Cold Cereal (Feb 7, 2012) 
  Unlucky Charms (Feb 5, 2013)
  Champions of Breakfast (Feb 11, 2014)
 Smek for President (Hyperion,  Feb 10, 2015)  – sequel to The True Meaning of SmekdaySchool's First Day of School (with Christian Robinson)

 As illustrator only 
  The Dirty Cowboy, written by Amy Timberlake (Farrar, Straus and Giroux, Aug 8, 2003)
 Lucy Rose: Here's the Thing About Me, Katy Kelly (Delacorte Books for Young Readers, Sep 14, 2004) – Lucy Rose novels by Katy Kelly, books 1–3; book 4 (2007) illus. by Peter Ferguson 
  Ste-e-e-e-eamboat a-Comin'!, Jill Esbaum (Farrar, Straus and Giroux, Mar 24, 2005)
  Lucy Rose: Big on Plans, Katy Kelly (Delacorte, Jun 14, 2005)
  Lucy Rose: Busy Like You Can't Believe, Katy Kelly (Delacorte, Sep 12, 2006)
 Small Beauties: The Journey of Darcy Heart O'Hara, Elvira Woodruff (Knopf Books for Young Readers, Sep 12, 2006)
  Billy Twitters and His Blue Whale Problem, Mac Barnett (Hyperion, Jun 23, 2009)
  Guess Again!, Mac Barnett (Simon & Schuster Children's Publishing, Sep 15, 2009)
 Brixton Brothers novels by Mac Barnett, published by Simon & Schuster Children's – books 1–3; book 4 (2012) illus. by Matthew Myers 
  The Case of the Case of Mistaken Identity (Oct 6, 2009)
  The Ghostwriter Secret (Oct 5, 2010)
  It Happened on a Train (Oct 4, 2011)
  Manners Mash-up: a goofy guide to good behavior, collaboration by Tedd Arnold, et al. (Dial Press, 2011) – "Each page is illustrated by a different artist." 
  Chloe and the Lion, Mac Barnett (Hyperion, 2012)
  Chu's Day, Neil Gaiman (HarperCollins, Jan 8, 2013)
  How This Book Was Made, Mac Barnett (Little, Brown Books for Young Readers, Sept 6, 2016)

 As writer and illustrator  
  Tree-Ring Circus (Harcourt Children's Books, Jun 1, 2006)
  Frankenstein Makes a Sandwich (Harcourt, Sep 1, 2006), poetry
  Pssst! (Harcourt, Sep 1, 2007)
  Frankenstein Takes the Cake (Harcourt, Sep 1, 2008), poetry
 Star Wars: Are You Scared, Darth Vader? (Disney-Lucasfilm Press, 2018)
  On Account of the Gum (Chronicle Books, October 6, 2020)

Role-playing gamesChangeling: The Dreaming (White Wolf)
 The Autumn People (1995) Interior Artist
 Immortal Eyes: Shadows on the Hill (1996) Interior Artist
 Immortal Eyes: Court of All Kings (1996) Interior Artist
 Changeling Players Guide (1996) Interior Artist
 Kithbook: Nockers (1997) Interior Artist
 Isle of the Mighty (1997) Cover Artist
 Changeling: The Dreaming, 2nd Ed. (1997) Interior Artist
 Kingdom of Willows (1998) Cover Artist

Planescape (TSR)
 Something Wild (1996) Interior Artist
 On Hallowed Ground (1996) Interior Artist
 Hellbound: The Blood War (1996) Interior Artist
 Doors to the Unknown (1996) Interior Artist
 A Guide to the Astral Plane (1996) Interior Artist
 The Great Modron March (1997) Interior Artist
 Faces of Evil: The Fiends (1997) Interior Artist
 Dead Gods (1997) Interior Artist
 Monstrous Compendium Planescape Appendix III (1998) Interior Artist
 The Inner Planes (1998) Interior Artist
 Faction War (1998) Interior Artist
 A Guide to the Ethereal Plane (1998) Interior ArtistDungeons & Dragons, 3rd edition (Wizards of the Coast)
 Monster Manual (2000) Interior Artist
 Monsters of Faerûn (Forgotten Realms) (2001) Interior Artist
 Lords of Darkness (Forgotten Realms) (2001) Interior Artist
 Silver Marches (Forgotten Realms) (2002) Interior Artist
 Unapproachable East (Forgotten Realms) (2003) Interior Artist
 Races of Faerûn (Forgotten Realms) (2003) Interior Artist
 Races of Stone (2004) Cover Artist
 Monster Manual III (2004) Interior Artist
 Races of the Wild (2005) Cover Artist

Other
 A Medieval Tapestry: Personalities of Mythic Europe (Ars Magica) (1997) Atlas Games, Cover Artist
 Guide to the Sabbat (Vampire: The Masquerade) (1999) White Wolf, Interior Artist
 Guide to the Camarilla (Vampire: The Masquerade) (1999) White Wolf, Interior Artist
 Dark•Matter Campaign Setting (1999) Wizards of the Coast, Interior Artist
 Wheel of Time Roleplaying Game (2001) Wizards of the Coast, Interior Artist
 Prophecies of the Dragon (Wheel of Time) (2002) Wizards of the Coast, Interior Artist
 Call of Cthulhu Roleplaying Game'' (Call of Cthulhu d20) (2002) Wizards of the Coast, Interior Artist

Awards
Winner, 2017 National Cartoonists Society Division Award for Book Illustration

References

External links 
 
 The True Meaning of Smekday official site
 Interview by Chris Rettstatt
 

1973 births
American children's book illustrators
American children's writers
American male novelists
Fantasy artists
Living people
Role-playing game artists
University of Arizona alumni